The Nuestra Señora del Patrocinio de Maria Parish Church (Our Lady of Patronage of Mary Parish Church), commonly known as Boljoon Church, is a Roman Catholic Church dedicated to the Our Lady of Patrocinio in the municipality of Boljoon, Cebu, Philippines, under the Roman Catholic Archdiocese of Cebu.

It has been declared a National Cultural Treasure by the National Museum of the Philippines and a National Historical Landmark by the National Historical Commission of the Philippines. It is also under consideration for the UNESCO World Heritage Sites of the Philippines as a member of  the Baroque Churches of the Philippines (Extension).

The Venerated Marian Image enshrined was granted a Decree of Canonical Coronation by Pope Francis. The Coronation Rites was held on April 23, 2022

Church history
Boljoon (also spelled Boljo-on) began as a small Christian settlement named Nabulho. It became a visita or chapel of ease of Sialo in 1599, with the small chapel being dedicated to the patronage of the Virgin Mary. It was elevated to a parish on October 31, 1690, by Father Francisco de Zamora, Provincial of the Augustinians, as a result of the increasing number of Christians in the area. The decision was implemented upon the appointment of Father Nicolás de la Cuadra as its first parish priest on April 5, 1692. By 1732, the Augustinians proposed to leave Boljoon owing to a shortage of priests; they eventually left on September 27, 1737. Administration of Boljoon was later transferred to the Jesuits. The Augustinians regained Boljoon in 1747, under an arrangement by which they ceded the settlements of Liloan, Cotcot, and Maraling to the Jesuits.

Architectural history
In 1782, earlier buildings in Boljoon were destroyed by pirates.  The present church was built by Augustinian priest Father Ambrosio Otero in 1783. Construction of the church was continued by Father Manuel Cordero in 1794 and completed by Father Julián Bermejo. Father Bermejo also built other structures as part of Boljoon's defense network, such as the watchtowers and blockhouse. The church was later restored by Father Leandro Morán, the last Augustinian priest of Boljoon, who served from 1920 to 1948. The following year, the Archdiocese of Cebu took charge of Boljoon. Father Zacarias Suñer was appointed as the first secular parish priest of Boljoon in 1958.

In 2007, restoration work was performed through the Boljoon Heritage Foundation, with funding from the Cebu Provincial Government.

Historical and cultural designations
The church was declared as a National Historical Landmark by the National Historical Institute in 1999, and it was listed as a National Cultural Treasure by the National Museum of the Philippines in 2001. It is the only church in Cebu listed as a National Cultural Treasure. It is also a candidate for UNESCO World Heritage Sites of the Philippines under the Baroque Churches of the Philippines (Extension) nomination, along with the San Pedro Apóstol Parish Church in Loboc, Bohol, La Inmaculada Concepción in Guiuan, Eastern Samar, San Matías in Tumauini, Isabela, and San Isidro Labrador in Lazi, Siquijor.

Church features
The church is a fortress church, built of coral stones and located on a hill near the sea. It originally served as a watchtower for Moro raids. The church is known for its original terracotta roof tiles and its distinct folk art or Filipino Baroque style seen predominantly on its choir screen and pulpit. Its ceiling paintings are the work of Miguel Villareal, a native of Boljoon. The three gates and the walls of the church are made of coral stones and were constructed from 1802 to 1808 under the auspices of Father Bermejo.

Altar

The main retablo is in pseudo-baroque rococo with gold leaf highlights and polychrome accents. Located on the central niche of the main altar is the image of Boljoon's patron, Our Lady of Patrocinio, brought by Father Bartolome de Garcia from Spain in 1599. A side chapel located on the left side of the church is also dedicated to the patron.

Bell tower
The rectangular bell tower used to have seven bells. The tower's ground floor was used as a prison cell, probably for pirates as can be assumed from the drawings of ships on the walls.

Church complex
Adjoining buildings were also built as part of the church complex and fortification.

Convent 
The first floor of the church convent houses a museum containing liturgical objects such as record books, images of saints, vestments and other relics.

Church plaza 
The church plaza, locally called Muraya, is mainly used for large church activities. It is believed to be a former burial ground and site of an early Hispanic burial site. Archaeological excavations undertaken by the University of San Carlos revealed several burial sites, antique jars and dishes, a necklace and a gold earring. The gold earring, the first archaeological find of its kind in a Philippine burial site, is probably worn by a person of high status and may have indicated "wealth, influence or great power".

Blockhouse

Also called the fortress or Dakong Balay (Big House), the quadrangular blockhouse was first built by Father Julian Bermejo when he came to Boljoon in 1808. The  blockhouse served as an artillery store and as the main fortress in the church complex. It is a two-story structure with a tile-covered parapet, built of coral stone with a tiled roof. Today it serves as a bell tower.

Cemetery
The first burials in Boljoon's cemetery probably occurred in the 1760s. It was closed when a public cemetery was opened. Its gates might have been built in the 1700s, or in 1783 when the present church was constructed. Consisting of coral stones, the cemetery has a symmetrical stone arch gateway with a three-layer pediment, finials on both sides of the two-lower layers and a stone relief of a human skeleton on top. The walls are also adorned with a relief of a human skull and bones.

Ilihan Watchtower ruins
A former square watchtower made out of coral stone stands on the Bohol coast. It is said to have been constructed by Father Bermejo as part of the church's massive fortification efforts.

References

External links

National Cultural Treasures of the Philippines
Roman Catholic churches in Cebu
Spanish colonial infrastructure in the Philippines
National Historical Landmarks of the Philippines
Baroque architecture in the Philippines
World Heritage Tentative List for the Philippines
Churches in the Roman Catholic Archdiocese of Cebu